Hutuna is a genus of moths of the family Crambidae.

Species
Hutuna aurantialis (Hampson, 1917)
Hutuna nigromarginalis Whalley, 1962

References

Pyraustinae
Crambidae genera